Raz El Ma  is a village and commune of the Cercle of Goundam in the Tombouctou Region of Mali. In the 2009 census the commune had a population of 4,121.

References

Communes of Tombouctou Region